Procridinae is a subfamily of the family Zygaenidae.

Selected genera
 Aethioprocris Alberti, 1954
 Alteramenelikia Alberti, 1971
 Acoloithus Clemens, 1860
 Adscita Retzius, 1783
 Ankasocris Viette, 1965
 Artona Walker, 1854
 Astyloneura Gaede, 1914
 Australartona Tarmann, 2005 
 Chalconycles Jordan, 1907
 Clelea Walker, 1854
 Euclimaciopsis Tremewan, 1973
 Gonioprocris Jordan, 1913
 Harrisina Packard, 1864
 Hestiochora Meyrick, 1886
 Homophylotis Turner, 1904 
 Ischnusia Jordan, 1928
 Janseola Hopp, 1923
 Jordanita Verity, 1946
 Madaprocris Viette, 1978
 Malamblia Jordan, 1907
 Metanycles Butler, 1876
 Myrtartona Tarmann, 2005 
 Neobalataea Alberti, 1954
 Neoprocris Jordan, 1915
 Palmartona Tarmann, 2005 
 Pollanisus Walker, 1854
 Pyromorpha Herrich-Schäffer, [1854]
 Pseudoamuria Tarmann, 2005 
 Pseudoprocris Druce in Godman & Salvin, 1884
 Onceropyga Turner, 1906 
 Rhagades Wallengren, 1863
 Saliunca Walker, 1865
 Saliuncella Jordan, 1907
 Seryda Walker, 1856
 Sthenoprocris Hampson, 1920
 Syringura Holland, 1893
 Tascia Walker, 1856
 Tasema Walker, 1856
 Tetraclonia Jordan, 1913
 Theresimima Strand, 1917
 Thyrassia Butler, 1876 
 Triacanthia Romieux, 1937
 Triprocris Grote, 1873
 Turneriprocris Bryk, 1936 
 Urodopsis Jordan, 1913
 Xenoprocris Romieux, 1937

References